2006 is a 10th anniversary of Paprika Korps - heavy reggae band from Poland. Because of that fact Karrot Kommando, their own label and the band itself decided to release on 1 March limited edition live album Konsertti Tampereella recorded on the previous tour in 2005.
This CD covers 10 years of heavy touring in 25 countries and it is a special tribute for Finnish and in general - European audience which supported the band for those years.

Track listing

 "Przede Wszystkim Muzyki" - 3:30
 "Crowd" - 3:34
 "From Soul To Soul" - 4:47
 "Nothing But A Sorrow" - 2:41
 "Nothing Dub" - 4:34
 "Mind Explorer" - 3:13
 "Starting Line" - 3:43
 "Camp Babylon" - 4:58
 "Old Man" - 3:51
 "Telewizor" - 3:25
 "Revolucja" - 10:03
 "High Expectations" - 5:32

2006 albums
Paprika Korps albums